Moritz Fritz (born 15 July 1993) is a German professional footballer who plays as a midfielder for FC Viktoria Köln.

References

External links
 
 

1993 births
Living people
Sportspeople from Bielefeld
German footballers
Association football midfielders
SV Lippstadt 08 players
FC Schalke 04 II players
Rot-Weiss Essen players
Borussia Dortmund II players
SC Fortuna Köln players
FC Viktoria Köln players
Regionalliga players
3. Liga players
Footballers from North Rhine-Westphalia